The Peluda in Spanish, or La Velue ('The Hairy One') originally in French, is a mythical beast that terrorized the environs of the River Huisne, France, during the Middle Ages. It is called "The Shaggy Beast (The Hairy Beast) of La Ferté-Bernard" in English translation.

The supposed serpent-headed creature had a body covered in long green fur with poison-tipped spines protruding. It caused flood (or shot out fire from its mouth) that destroyed crops, devoured livestock and humans, and struck humans and animals dead with its tail. It was defeated after it tried to prey upon a maiden named l'Agnelle; her fiancé slew it by delivering a sword-strike to the tail, its only weak spot.

Name 

The   (French, meaning ‘shaggy/hairy one’) was introduced as "", in Spanish, in Jorge Luis Borges's Book of Imaginary Beings (1957), and translated as the "Shaggy Beast of La Ferté-Bernard" or "The Hairy Beast of La Ferté-Bernard" in English versions of the book. Borges's description compares rather closely to the that given in French by the local man of letters, Paul Cordonnier-Détrie (1954). A pamphlet of "La Velue" was printed in 1889 for the Sarthe area, and its text also gave a physical description of the mythical beast in similar language.

Description 

The so-called "" of La Ferté-Bernard" lived on the banks of the River Huisne, and came out to terrorize the populace as far as the city of La Ferté-Bernard during the High Middle Ages, or perhaps more accurately the 15th century during the Late Middle Ages.

Physical description 

The French sources tells that the beast was serpent-headed and serpent-tailed, ox-sized with an egg-shaped body covered in "long green fur", and "from amidst [the fur] there emerged sharp spikes endowed with deadly sting", and it had broad tortoise-like feet.

This beast obviously belonged to the same family as the mythical beast Tarasque of Tarascon and Beaucaire, in the opinion of Cordonnier-Détrie. Other commentators have lumped together these two beasts into a class of dragons.

Folklore 
According to the lore, the beast was excluded from Noah's Ark, yet survived the Deluge, i.e., the Biblical Flood.

Later it dwelled in the River Huisne, and rampage across the nearby countryside, and even into the streets of the old city of La Ferté-Bernard, which for all its fortifications was which was defenseless against it. Striking out with its serpent-like tail, it could kill both humans and animals. It would raid sheep-folds and devour all the livestock (the sheep) within. When chased, it retreated into the River Huisne and caused a flood, ruining the crops and bringing famine to the populace. Borges's claims that the monster "shot out flames that withered crops" is echoed by the poet Claud Roy's description that the velue "set crops on fire with its flame-throwing mouth".

It would snatch also human victims to devour, especially children and young maidens. After it captured the most virtuous maiden named l'Agnelle ("Little Lamb"), it was finally defeated by her fiancé who took his sword and struck the tail, which was the only vulnerable point on the beast, causing immediate death. The spot where it died was at the bridge of Yvré-l'Évêque, according to popular tradition. The victory was long celebrated afterwards at La Ferté-Bernard and Connerré, and the people stuffed (or embalmed) the body of the beast, so it has been told.

Etymology 
Its name is derived from this shaggy appearance.

Iconography 

A drawing of a velue is found on the cover of the aforementioned 1889 French pamphlet. Another illustration of the velue occurs in Jean Paul Ronecker's book on dragons (2004).<ref>Ronecker, Jean Paul (2004) Le Dragon', p. 32.

A terra cotta dragon dated to the 17–18th century held by the abbey of Tuffé was attached with the claim that it depict a velue; the piece was discovered in a ditch along the road to La Chapelle-Saint-Rémy. Also at Tuffé, a velue fountain has been installed in 2007, on the open square facing the Église Saint-Pierre-et-Saint-Paul.

In popular culture

A game app named "Baldik" featuring combat with the velue that reappeared in the town's Perche Émeraude landmark has been developed by the office of tourism of La Ferté-Bernard.

The outer shell of the final boss of SquareSoft's Chrono Trigger, Lavos, resembles the Peluda.

The Peluda also appears in The Secret Saturdays''.

See also
Gargouille
Tarasque

External links

Explanatory notes

References
Citations

Bibliography

  3p
 
 
 , under "La Velue, monstre de la Vallée de l'Huisne".
 
 

French legendary creatures
European dragons
Mythological hybrids
Sarthe